A Thousand Kisses is a 2011 South Korean television series, starring Seo Young-hee, Ji Hyun-woo, Ryu Jin and Kim So-eun. It explores the question of age differences in romance. It aired on MBC from August 20, 2011 to February 5, 2012 on Saturdays and Sundays at 20:40 for 50 episodes.

Plot
Woo Joo-young (Seo Young-hee) is the eldest daughter in the family and have come through hardships in life thanks to her bright and caring personality. Her husband Tae-kyung has an affair which ends in their divorce. One day, Joo-young takes her son Chan-noh to a soccer game and meets Jang Woo-bin (Ji Hyun-woo), a former national soccer player who's now a sports agent. Chan-noh warms to Woo-bin and this leads to a close friendship between Joo-young and Woo-bin. Woo-bin romances the divorced single mom, but their differences in age, social status and life experience create obstacles to their relationship.

Jang Byung-doo (Lee Soon-jae) is the chaebol head of a resort group who falls in love with his caregiver Yoo Ji-sun (Cha Hwa-yeon), and they marry.)

Meanwhile, the chaebol's son Jang Woo-jin (Ryu Jin) is the cold and haughty planning manager at his father's resort, who has a strained relationship with his father marked by lingering resentment — he feels Dad showed little kindness to his mother, who died of a hereditary illness. Woo Joo-mi (Kim So-eun) is a freelance reporter for a magazine who doesn't remember her own mother's face, having been raised by her older sister Joo-young and grandmother. She falls for Woo-jin at first sight despite their 9-year age difference, and thanks to her proactive personality, tackles her crush head-on. Rather than suffering from lovesickness on her own, she goes after him assertively, and wins him over by melting his icy exterior with her optimistic, affectionate nature.

Cast

Main characters
 Seo Young-hee as Woo Joo-young  
 Ji Hyun-woo as Jang Woo-bin 
 Ryu Jin as Jang Woo-jin (Woo-bin's cousin)
 Kim So-eun as Woo Joo-mi (Joo-young's younger sister)

Supporting characters
Cha Soo-yeon as Han Yoo-kyung (Woo-bin's first love)
Shim Hyung-tak as Park Tae-kyung 
Lee Soon-jae as Jang Byung-doo
Cha Hwa-yeon as Yoo Ji-sun 
Goo Seung-hyun as Park Chan-noh
Kim Chang-sook as Min Ae-ja 
Jung Ga-eun as Jang Hye-bin 
Jung Jae-soon as Yum Jung-soon
Nam Ji-hyun as Jang Soo-ah
Ban Hyo-jung as Cha Kyung-soon
Lee Mi-young as Oh Bok-joo 
Lee Ja-young as Yang Joon-hee
Kim Chang-wan as Jang Byung-shik
Yoon Doo-joon as Yoon Ki-joon (cameo)
Lee Tae-ri as Moon Gi-joon (cameo)
Yoo Yeon-seok as Hyung-soo, soccer player

Notes

International broadcast
 It aired in Vietnam on Let's Viet VTC9 on October 2, 2015 under the title Tình yêu không tuổi.
 In Singapore and Malaysia, it aired on Oh!K from November 26, 2020 to early February 2021.

References

External links
A Thousand Kisses official MBC website 
A Thousand Kisses at MBC Global Media

MBC TV television dramas
2011 South Korean television series debuts
2012 South Korean television series endings
Korean-language television shows
South Korean romance television series